Victor Doerksen  (born November 25, 1953) is a politician, accountant and former cabinet minister in Alberta, Canada.

Early life
Doerksen was born in Bassano, Alberta on November 25, 1953. He was employed by the Bank of Montreal for 12 years. He left his job to run for political office a day after hearing about John Oldring retiring as MLA for Red Deer South.

Albertan politician
Doerksen was first elected to the riding of Red Deer South after it was created from the old Red Deer riding in the 1993 Alberta general election. He held the seat for 4 terms for the Progressive Conservatives and did not seek re-election in the 2008 election.

After winning his 3rd term in office in the 2001 election, Doerksen was appointed as the Minister of Innovation and Science and sworn into the portfolio in 2001.

Doerksen quit his post as the Minister of Innovation and Science on August 15, 2006, and announced his candidacy for the leadership of the Progressive Conservatives on August 17.  He finished seventh of eight candidates on the first ballot with less than one percent of the vote; after being required to drop out, he declined to endorse any of his opponents.

References

External links
Alberta Cabinet Minister Quits CFCN News August 15, 2006
Victor Doerksen's homepage

 

1953 births
Living people
Progressive Conservative Association of Alberta MLAs
Red Deer, Alberta city councillors
Members of the Executive Council of Alberta
21st-century Canadian politicians